Ice navigation vessel is a class of ships specially prepared for independent ice navigation in the waters of the polar seas and for following icebreakers in especially difficult ice conditions. The geometry of the hull contours of ice navigation ships is intermediate between the contours of an icebreaker and the shape of a conventional transport vessel.

Their reliability is determined by their ability to withstand the loads acting on them while sailing in ice at a given speed, as well as the loads from compression by ice masses. The target capabilities determine the requirements for enhanced capacity of the power plant, the strength of the hull, propellers, propeller shaft and steering gear. It may also include adaptations for functioning in freezing conditions and equipment necessary for navigation in ice.

Various registration authorities assign ice classes to vessels based on their technical characteristics. Due to this, ice navigation vessels are usually referred to as ice-class vessels without indicating which class they belong to, but indicating the type of vessel (e.g. ice-class tanker, ice-class cargo ship etc).

References

Ship types
Ice in transportation